Illinois Route 113 (IL 113) is a  two-lane state route that runs east from IL 47 north of Mazon and east of Seneca to IL 17 in western Kankakee, just across the Kankakee River from U.S. Route 45 (US 45) and US 52.

Route description 
Route 113 begins at a junction with Route 47 in Grundy County north of Mazon. From here, the route heads east through a rural area before passing through Coal City and Diamond. At the eastern edge of Diamond, Route 113 meets Interstate 55. Past this junction, the route turns southward, entering Braidwood along Division Street. The highway turns east onto Main Street and intersects Illinois Route 129 and Illinois Route 53 at separate junctions. After leaving Braidwood to the east, Route 113 follows the southern bank of the Kankakee River; Illinois Route 102 parallels this stretch of the route on the northern bank of the river. At Custer Park, the route crosses the Wauponsee Glacial Trail. Past Custer Park, the route runs past Kankakee River State Park. It then meets County Route 20, which crosses the river and connects Route 113 to Route 102. Past this junction, Route 113 enters Kankakee County. The road continues to follow the river into Kankakee, where it terminates at Route 17.

History 
SBI Route 113 was the name of both roads on the north and south sides of the Kankakee River from Diamond (between Coal City and Braidwood on Interstate 55) to Kankakee. In 1940, the route became Illinois Route 113N and Illinois Route 113S, with 113N as the northern route and 113S as the southern, with 113S used as the western end to U.S. Route 66 (now Interstate 55). In 1961, Illinois 113S became Illinois Route 113, and 113N was renamed Illinois Route 102.

Major intersections

See also

 List of state highways in Illinois

References

External links

113
Transportation in Grundy County, Illinois
Transportation in Will County, Illinois
Transportation in Kankakee County, Illinois